The 1995 USA Outdoor Track and Field Championships was organised by USA Track & Field and held from June 20 to 24 at Hughes Stadium, on the campus of Sacramento City College in Sacramento, California. The four-day competition served as the national championships in track and field for the United States and also the trials for the 1995 World Championships in Athletics in Gothenburg, Sweden.

Athletes that finished in the top three of their event and held the IAAF qualifying standard were eligible to represent the United States at the 1995 World Championships. The United States was able to send three athletes per event to the competition, provided they all met the A qualification standard.  The World Championships national selection for the marathon and 50 kilometres walk were incorporated into the discrete national championship meets for those events. Selection for the relay races were made by committee.

Eight Americans went on to win an individual gold medal at the 1995 World Championships;  Michael Johnson won three including being a part of the 4x400 relay, Derrick Adkins, Allen Johnson, John Godina, Dan O'Brien, Gwen Torrence, Gail Devers and Kim Batten.  In addition USA won the Women's 4 × 100 metres relay, Women's 4 × 400 metres relay and Men's 4 × 400 metres relay.

Results
Key:

Men track events

Men field events

Women track events

Women field events

References

Results

USA Outdoor Track and Field Championships
USA Outdoors
Track, Outdoor
Sports competitions in Sacramento, California
USA Outdoor Track and Field Championships
Track and field in California